Claire Elise Boucher  (born March 17, 1988), known professionally as Grimes, is a Canadian musician, singer, songwriter, and record producer. Her early work has been described as extending from "lo-fi R&B" to futuristic dance-pop, and has incorporated influences from electronic music, hip hop, and rock. Her lyrics often touch on science fiction and feminist themes. She has released five studio albums.

Born and raised in Vancouver (later moving to Montreal), Grimes began releasing music independently in the late 2000s, releasing two albums, Geidi Primes and Halfaxa, in 2010 on Arbutus Records. She subsequently signed with 4AD and rose to prominence with the release of her third studio album, Visions, in 2012. Visions includes the singles "Genesis" and "Oblivion" and received the Canadian music industry Juno Award for Electronic Album of the Year. Following this, her fourth studio album, Art Angels, was released in 2015 and received critical praise as several publications named it the best album of the year. Her fifth studio album, Miss Anthropocene, was released in 2020.

Outside of music, Grimes had a voice role in the 2020 action role-playing video game Cyberpunk 2077 and is a judge on the music competition game show Alter Ego.

Early life
Boucher was born and raised in Vancouver, British Columbia, on March 17, 1988. She is of French Canadian (including Québécois), Italian, and German-Ukrainian descent. She was raised Catholic, and attended Catholic school. Her mother, Sandy Garossino, is a former Crown prosecutor and arts advocate; her father, Maurice Boucher, a former banker, works "in the business side of biotech". In 2006, Boucher graduated from Lord Byng Secondary School and relocated from Vancouver to Montreal to attend McGill University focusing on neuroscience and Russian language, but left the university in early 2011 before finishing her degree.

Career

2009–2011: Career beginnings, Geidi Primes, and Halfaxa

According to the timestamps on her original Myspace page, Boucher began writing music under the name Grimes in 2007. Her performer name was chosen because at the time, MySpace allowed artists to list three musical genres. She listed "grime" for all three, without knowing what the grime music genre was. Grimes is self-taught in music and visual art.

In January 2010, Grimes released her debut album, Geidi Primes, a concept album inspired by the Dune series, followed by her second album, Halfaxa, in October of the same year. After the release of Halfaxa, she began to publicly promote her music and tour beyond Montreal. In 2011 Grimes released five songs on her side of the split 12" with d'Eon, Darkbloom (through both Arbutus and Hippos in Tanks). Beginning in May 2011, Grimes opened for Lykke Li on her North American Tour, and the following August her debut album was re-released through No Pain in Pop Records, in CD and vinyl format for the first time. In 2011, she collaborated with DJ/producer Blood Diamonds.

2011–2014: Visions

Following extensive touring and positive reception to her first two albums and Darkbloom contribution, Grimes signed with record label 4AD in January 2012. Her third studio album, Visions, was released on January 31, 2012 in Canada through Arbutus Records, February 21, 2012 in the United States through 4AD, and various dates in March 2012 elsewhere. appeared on a number of publications' year-end lists and is considered Grimes' breakout album. NME included it on their 500 Greatest Albums of All Time list in 2013. Visions won the Electronic Album of the Year Award and Grimes was nominated for the Breakthrough Artist of the Year at the Junos. Grimes also won the Artist of the Year Award at the 2013 Webbys.

 The album's second single, "Oblivion", was named the best song of 2012 by Pitchfork and was produced into a music video co-directed by Emily Kai Bock and Grimes. Pitchfork ranked "Oblivion" at number one on their 200 Best Tracks of the Decade So Far list in 2014. In interviews following the album's release, Grimes explained that she was assigned a strict deadline by which to have her third album finished far before it was complete, resulting in her recording the bulk of Visions while isolated in her Montreal apartment for three consecutive weeks. Notably, this intensive recording session included a period of nine days without sleep or food and with blacked out windows, since she generally could not make music as readily during the day, and doing "tons of amphetamines" She described the writing process as being "equally enjoyable and tortuous", feeling that its difficulty contributed to its success. Grimes went on the Visions Tour from 2012 to 2014 with supporting acts Born Gold, Myths, Elite Gymnastics, and Ami Dang. In March 2012, Grimes collaborated with Cop Car Bonfire's Tim Lafontaine and went under the name, Membrain. They released an EP called, Sit Back, Rewind. In May 2012, Grimes was featured on Blood Diamonds's song "Phone Sex". In July 2012, Grimes toured as a supporting act with Diplo and Skrillex on the Full Flex Express Canadian Train Tour. In August 2012, Grimes made her American television debut on Late Night With Jimmy Fallon.

In April 2013, Grimes posted a written statement addressing her experience as a female musician as rife with sexism and expressed disappointment that her feminist stance was often interpreted as anti-male. When speaking about her preference to produce all her studio albums herself, she said, "I don't wanna be just like the face of this thing I built, I want to be the one who built it".

In December 2013, Grimes employed the services of Jay-Z's management company, Roc Nation.

2014–2017: Art Angels

On June 26, 2014, Grimes premiered the new track "Go", produced by and featuring Blood Diamonds. It was a track that had been written for and rejected by Rihanna and was premiered on Zane Lowe's radio 1 show. Rolling Stone ranked it number fourteen on their Best Songs of 2014 list. In July 2014, Grimes was featured on Bleachers' song "Take Me Away" from their album, Strange Desire. On August 19, 2014, Grimes was featured in the music for the remix of Haim's My Song 5.

On March 8, 2015, Grimes released a self-directed video for a demo version of "Realiti" from an abandoned album. It received critical acclaim from music critics, being named Best New Music by Jenn Pelly from Pitchfork, calling it the "best new Grimes song since Visions." On March 15, 2015, Grimes and Bleachers released their collaboration, "Entropy" for the HBO TV show Girls. In the summer of 2015, Grimes toured with Lana Del Rey for several of her Endless Summer Tour dates. She then toured in the fall of 2015 as the headliner of her own Rhinestone Cowgirls Tour with opener Nicole Dollanganger.

Speaking of her upcoming fourth album, scheduled for a "surprise" release in October, Grimes said that record was recorded with "real instruments", a departure from the primarily synth and sampler driven composing of her prior releases. On October 26, 2015, Grimes released the lead single of the album, "Flesh Without Blood", as well as a two-act music video comprising both "Flesh Without Blood" and "Life in the Vivid Dream", another song from the upcoming album. The album, titled Art Angels, was released in November to favourable reviews, garnering an 88 (out of 100) rating on Metacritic and the Best New Music designation from Pitchfork. Jessica Hopper of Pitchfork described Art Angels as "evidence of Boucher's labor and an articulation of a pop vision that is incontrovertibly hers... an epic holiday buffet of tendentious feminist fuck-off, with second helpings for anonymous commenters and music industry blood-suckers."

Art Angels was named best album of the year by NME, Exclaim!, and Stereogum. It peaked at number 1 on the Billboard US Top Alternative Album Chart and number 2 on the Billboard Top Independent Album chart. Grimes won the 2016 International award at the Socan Annual Awards and the 2016 Harper's Bazaar Musician of the Year Award in October.

In the spring of 2016, Grimes toured Asia and Europe with supporting act Hana on the Ac!d Reign Tour. Grimes continued touring through the summer of 2016, performing at various music festivals across North America and opening for Florence and the Machine on select dates of the How Beautiful Tour.

Continuing the series of music videos for songs off Art Angels that began with "Flesh Without Blood" and "Life in the Vivid Dream" ("Act I" and "Act II", respectively), Grimes released the music video for "Kill V. Maim" ("Act III") on January 19, 2016, and the music video for "California" ("Act IV") on May 9, 2016. Grimes crafted a slightly remixed version of "California" for the music video to achieve a less "dissonant" visual/auditory mix. This alternate version of California has not otherwise been officially released for sale or streaming. On August 3, 2016, Grimes released the song "Medieval Warfare" as part of the soundtrack of the summer blockbuster Suicide Squad.

On October 5, 2016, Grimes with friend and collaborator Hana Pestle, more commonly known by stage name Hana, released "The Ac!d Reign Chronicles", a lo-fi series of seven music videos including songs by Grimes ("Butterfly", "World Princess Part II", "Belly of the Beat" and "Scream") and Hana ("Underwater", "Chimera" and "Avalanche"), each starring in their respective segments. Additional appearances include Aristophanes in Scream and two of Grimes' backup dancers, Linda Davis and Alyson Van, throughout the series. "The AC!D Reign Chronicles" were recorded over the course of two weeks during the duo's time touring Europe and were made with minimal production, shot exclusively on iPhones with no crew aside from her brother, Mac Boucher, who assisted with filming. In 2016, Grimes helped write Troye Sivan's song Heaven from the album, Blue Neighbourhood.

On February 2, 2017, Grimes premiered on Tidal the high budget futuristic music video of "Venus Fly", starring herself and Janelle Monáe. The video was uploaded on YouTube on February 9, 2017. She won Best Dance Video for "Venus Fly" at the Much Music Video Awards. In 2017, Grimes won a JUNO Award for Video of the Year, featuring "Kill V. Maim". On October 19, 2017, Grimes released a cover of Tegan and Sara’s "Dark Come Soon" with Hana. The cover is a part of Tegan and Sara's The Con X: Covers album.

2018–2021: Miss Anthropocene and collaborations

In February 2018, Grimes wrote on Instagram, "well no music any time soon after all." It was later revealed that this was due to a clash with her label, 4AD. She later revealed on an Instagram post that she would eventually be releasing two albums, and that "they would be separated by a period of time", with the first being released with 4AD, and the second with an undisclosed label. Grimes stated that this first album would be "highly collaborative and [characterized by] most glorious light", with the second highlighting themes of "pure darkness and chaos".

On April 10, 2018, Grimes was featured on "Pynk," the third single from Janelle Monáe's album, Dirty Computer. On May 30, 2018, Grimes was featured on "Love4Eva" by Loona yyxy, the lead single from South Korean girl group Loona's third sub-unit's debut EP Beauty & the Beat. On June 15, 2018, she was featured in a video for Apple's Behind the Mac series on their YouTube channel, with a preview of a song from her upcoming album titled "That's What the Drugs Are For", later released as "My Name Is Dark". On the same day, she posted two Twitter videos previewing two songs from her upcoming album, "adore u (beautiful game)" and "4ÆM". In 2018, Grimes composed the theme music for Netflix's animated series Hilda. On October 19, 2018, Grimes was featured on Jimmy Urine’s "The Medicine Does Not Control Me" from the album, Euringer.

On October 31, 2018, Grimes was featured on "Play Destroy" by Poppy on her album Am I a Girl? Shortly after the release of "Play Destroy", Poppy accused Grimes of bullying during the making of "Play Destroy" stating:

Grimes responded by saying:

On November 29, 2018, Grimes released the single, "We Appreciate Power" featuring Hana, which was described as an industrial rock and nu metal song. On December 11, 2018, Grimes performed the song on The Tonight Show Starring Jimmy Fallon. Grimes also appeared on Bring Me the Horizon's "Nihilist Blues" from their sixth album, Amo.

On August 13, 2019, Grimes posted an advertisement for the Adidas by Stella McCartney Fall 2019 collection on Instagram, stating that she would release the first single off her upcoming album, Miss Anthropocene, on September 13, 2019. She released the music video for "Violence", featuring i_o, on September 5, 2019. On October 25, 2019, an unfinished version of the album was leaked online. On November 15, 2019, she released two versions of the single "So Heavy I Fell Through the Earth" and performed "4ÆM" at the 2019 Video Game Awards in order to introduce herself as Lizzy Wizzy, a voiced character in the game Cyberpunk 2077. On November 29, 2019, Grimes released the single "My Name Is Dark". On December 13, 2019, Grimes released the single "4ÆM". Miss Anthropocene was released on February 21, 2020. On February 12, 2020, she released the single "Delete Forever", which was partly inspired by the death of Lil Peep and the ongoing opioid crisis. On February 27, 2020, Grimes released a music video for the song "Idoru". On April 1, 2020, Grimes released a music video for the song "You’ll Miss Me When I’m Not Around" and asked fans to finish the video because it only features Grimes and a green screen. On June 17, 2020, Grimes was featured on Ashnikko's song, "Cry" from her mixtape, Demidevil.

Grimes made an appearance on the Adult Swim sketch comedy show, The Eric Andre Show. Her collaboration with Janelle Monáe, "Pynk", was featured on episode 5 of the television series, I May Destroy You. Her song "Oblivion" was featured on episode 9 of the same series. Grimes collaborated with Benee on the dance-style song "Sheesh" on the latter's debut album, Hey U X, released on November 11, 2020. Her song, "Kill V Maim" was featured in the soundtrack of the 2020 film, Mainstream. On December 11, 2020, Grimes and other associated artists, all using aliases, released a Cyberpunk 2077-themed DJ mix album on Apple Music, titled This story is dedicated to all those cyberpunks who fight against injustice and corruption every day of their lives!. It contains two new songs by Grimes, "Samana" and "Delicate Weapon". On December 18, 2020, nine months after the release of her fifth studio album, Miss Anthropocene, Grimes changed the cover art for the album on all streaming platforms. The new cover art is a painting by Rupid Leejm that Grimes commissioned to use. In discussing the process of choosing the cover art originally, “I polled a bunch of ppl and everyone said not to use it (??) but I wish I trusted my gut. I fucking LOVE this painting." On January 1, 2021, Grimes released Miss Anthropocene: Rave Edition, a remix album featuring new versions of songs on the album by artists including BloodPop, Channel Tres, Richie Hawtin, and Modeselektor, along with two remixes from her Cyberpunk 2077 Apple Music DJ mix.

2021–present: Alter Ego, collaborations, Fairies Cum First, and Book 1 
On March 5, 2021, Grimes signed with Columbia Records. On May 8, 2021, Grimes made an appearance on a Saturday Night Live sketch as Princess Peach alongside host Elon Musk as Wario. Her song "California" was featured in the computer-animated film The Mitchells vs. the Machines. In June 2021, she appeared in Doja Cat's music video "Need to Know".

Later in June, she started a new partnered Discord server called "Grimes Metaverse Super Beta" and a new podcast "Homo Techno", co-hosted with science communicator Liv Boeree. She used the Discord server to tease new music frequently, and released a snippet of a song called "Shinigami Eyes" which she continued to promote in subsequent social media posts, as well as an upcoming collaboration with British DJ Chris Lake. Grimes spoke about an upcoming concept album with Billboard, describing it as a "space opera".

In July 2021 Grimes, alongside will.i.am, Alanis Morissette, Nick Lachey, and Rocsi Diaz were revealed as judges on Alter Ego, a new singing competition series in which the contestants make the use of motion capture technology to portray themselves as "dream avatars". On July 21, 2021, Grimes preview the song "100% Tragedy". On July 23, 2021, Grimes made a cameo appearance in the short film Discord: The Movie, alongside Awkwafina, Danny DeVito, and J Balvin. On September 30, 2021, Grimes released a new song titled "Love". The song was recorded in response to her split from Elon Musk and the increased media attention from it. On December 3, 2021, Grimes released a new song titled "Player of Games". On the same day, she also announced the title of her sixth studio album, Book 1. In December 2021, Grimes teased a collaboration with the Weeknd on Discord saying that the collaboration would be released in 2022.

In January 2022, Grimes partnered with the video game Rocket League for the Neon Nights event. The event ran from January 26 to February 8, 2022, and featured Grimes-themed items and her songs "Shinigami Eyes" and "Player of Games". In January 2022, Grimes announced a 10th anniversary vinyl of her album Visions.

On January 26, 2022, Grimes released "Shinigami Eyes". A week later, on February 3, 2022, Grimes announced her forthcoming EP titled Fairies Cum First. In April 2022, Grimes was featured on the song, "Last Day" by the Russian band IC3PEAK from the album Kiss of Death. Grimes was featured in the music video for Bella Poarch's "Dolls" which was released on July 15, 2022. Grimes is an opening act on select dates for Swedish House Mafia's "Paradise Again Tour" alongside Kaytranada, ZHU, and Alesso. The tour ran from July 29 to November 13, 2022. Grimes appeared on Bella Poarch's song, "No Man's Land" from the Dolls EP, which was released on August 12, 2022.

In August 2022, Grimes was featured on the cover of Vogue Plus China, in which she did an interview and further discussed her upcoming collaboration with the Weeknd. She confirmed that the song is called "Sci Fi" and is set for release in mid-2022. She also provided more details about her upcoming studio album and EP, stating, "all these projects [will] come together and merge into one project at the end." On September 17, 2022, she revealed that she has twenty songs for her upcoming album and teased that the album might be divided into two albums. She also confirmed that the album was in the process of being mixed. In January 2023, Grimes gave an update on her delayed sixth album, Book 1, announcing that her career was a 'side quest' now and that her children, friends and family were her priorities. On January 31, 2023, it was announced that Grimes would feature on Caroline Polachek's song "Fly to You", alongside Dido. The song is from Polachek's fourth studio album, Desire, I Want to Turn Into You, which released on February 14, 2023.

Artistry

Musical style
Grimes' music has been described with a number of labels, including synth-pop, electropop, art pop, indie pop, dream pop, experimental pop, pop, avant-garde pop, lo-fi, dance, witch house, electronic, glo-fi, bedroom pop, and electronica with elements of rock, hip hop, R&B, folk, drum and bass, and classical.

According to Vulture, "[Grimes moved away] from the creepy, lo-fi R&B of her early releases to the futuristic dance-pop of her...[third] album, Visions." For her fourth studio, Art Angels, Grimes learned how to play guitar and violin. She stated "I didn’t want to play the keys, ’cause I don’t want to be considered synth-pop." Rolling Stone described the album as a "[move away from her] hazy synth-pop toward an off-kilter guitars-and-beats sound," and "uses rock sounds in a really different context." Grimes described her fifth studio album Miss Anthropocene as "mostly ethereal nu metal." The Guardian summarised her musical style: "By sounding a little like everything you've ever heard, the whole sounds like nothing you've ever heard." The Japan Times wrote that Grimes' "otherworldly, Ableton-assisted music is crammed full of hooks fit to sit alongside Rihanna and Taylor Swift in the Top 40". Dazed stated: "In a sense, she'd always thrived on being too pop for indie and too indie for pop". Her lyrics were described by The Guardian as "generally elusive and impressionistic, shying away from specifics". Grimes is a soprano. The Daily Telegraph described her vocals as "sweet, thin and hazy." She utilizes looping and layering techniques, particularly with vocals; many of her songs feature layers of over fifty different vocal tracks which create an "ethereal" sound. Her lyrical themes include science fiction, feminism, and climate change. Her fifth studio album Miss Anthropocene has been considered to be a loose concept album about an "anthropomorphic goddess of climate change" inspired by Roman mythology and villainy. Heather Phares of AllMusic described the album as a "brooding embodiment of climate change." In the single "So Heavy I Fell Through the Earth" she also experimented with AI-generated music using the NSynth neural synthesizer.

Grimes described her music as "ADD music", shifting frequently and dramatically – "I go through phases a lot." She said "Most music with traditional verse, chorus and bridge structures can probably be considered 'pop.' But I think most people think about Top 40 these days when they use the word 'pop,' and I'm emphatically not from that world." She said that Panda Bear's 2007 album Person Pitch "jumpstarted" her mind. She explains, "Up until that point I had basically only made weird atonal drone music, with no sense of songwriting. I barely understood anything about music ... But suddenly all music clicked into place and seemed so simple and easy. I was pretty much able to spontaneously write songs immediately after listening to this album once."

Influences
Her work has been likened to various artists, including Björk, Julianna Barwick, Siouxsie Sioux, and Enya. She has stated that she loves British rock bands like Bring Me the Horizon and Foals. She was described by Tastemakers Magazine as an "alien love-child of Aphex Twin and ABBA". While making her third studio album, Grimes was listening to Aphex Twin, Black Dice, Dungeon Family, Michael Jackson, New Edition, Outkast, Nine Inch Nails, Burial, TLC, Mariah Carey and stated "I'm into the really caustic beats, the kind of sharp drum and bass kind of stuff. Really nice vocals too, with lots of tight harmonies at the same time."

Grimes cites Blink-182 as an influence in her Amoeba Records “What’s In My Bag?” episode where she picked one of their live DVDs. Grimes considers Blue Hawaii "a big part of my family in Montreal." Grimes stated that Cocteau Twins are "one of the first bands I was into that was considered alternative." In a tweet, Grimes replied to someone saying that her recent influences were Chris Isaak, St. Vincent, and Mindless Self Indulgence. The theories of her second studio album, Halfaxa were inspired by Hildegard of Bingen.

Before releasing her fourth studio album, Art Angels, Grimes described one of her upcoming songs as a glam rock track inspired by David Bowie and Queen. Art Angels was also influenced by Billy Joel, Bruce Springsteen, and The Godfather movies. Grimes said that while touring with How to Dress Well, his song "Suicide Dream 2" "made me tear up every night... [and] after this tour I got really re-inspired, went home, and immediately wrote [songs that] are, in my opinion, the best shit I’ve ever done. Early on, Grimes stated that "an early diet of the Spice Girls, Marilyn Manson, OutKast and Skinny Puppy drove her to build pop songs out of the harsher sonic textures she rarely heard on the radio." Grimes considers her female pop idols/influences to be Mariah Carey, Dandi Wind, and Beyoncé. Some of her other influences include Jedi Mind Tricks, Kenji Kawai, Yoko Kanno, Yayoi Kusama, Geinoh Yamashirogumi, Alicia Keys, Panda Bear, Bikini Kill, Kate Bush, Al Green, Salem, Marilyn Manson, Trent Reznor, Tool, Yeah Yeah Yeahs, Paramore, Enya, Joanna Newsom, medieval music, medieval choral music, K-pop, and The Legend of Zelda.

Visual art 
Grimes designs her album art for all of her albums, gig fliers, comic book covers, and merchandise. She has done exhibitions showcasing her works and has stated that "[she has] always been a visual artist". Her art is influenced by Japanese anime, manga, and comic artists such as Charles Burns and Daniel Clowes. Her illustrations have appeared in gallery shows, including at Guggenheim Museum Bilbao. She created an alternate cover for Image Comics' The Wicked + The Divine, and designed a capsule collection of t-shirts for Hedi Slimane's Saint Laurent, in 2013. That year, she also curated a two-day event at the Audio Visual Arts Gallery in New York City with a silent auction to benefit the Native Women's Association of Canada's campaign to raise awareness of violence against aboriginal women in Canada. In early 2021, she sold original digital art in the form of non-fungible tokens for $5.8 million. In May 2022, she said on Twitter she was joining the board of Unicorn DAO, "to help their mission to fund/ develop female and non-binary lead art and projects."

Personal life
Boucher has a step-brother who raps under the name Jay Worthy; they collaborated on the single "Christmas Song", released on the Rough Trade bonus disc of her Visions album. One of her brothers, Mac Boucher, was involved in the making of some of her music videos, such as "Violence", "Go", "Realiti", "Flesh Without Blood/Life in the Vivid Dream", "Kill V. Maim", "Venus Fly" and "We Appreciate Power".

In 2009, Boucher and a friend attempted to sail down the Mississippi River to New Orleans from Minneapolis in a houseboat they built. Following several mishaps, including engine trouble and encounters with law enforcement, the houseboat was impounded by the city of Minneapolis. Boucher claims that elements of the story were exaggerated in the newspapers that reported on it at the time. The adventure has been turned into an animated video narrated by T-Bone Burnett.

In the past, Boucher has been open about her drug use, stating during the creation of Visions in 2012, she "blacked out the windows and did tons of amphetamine and stayed up for three weeks and didn't eat anything". In 2014, Boucher wrote a blog post expressing her aversion to hard drugs.

Boucher has a lisp; she stated that she "likes it", and has no desire to undergo speech therapy.

Relationships
From 2007 to 2010, Boucher was in an on-and-off relationship with Devon Welsh, then lead vocalist of Majical Cloudz. The two met in 2007 at a first-year dorm party while studying at McGill University. From 2012 to 2018, Boucher was in a relationship with electronic musician Jaime Brooks, who supported her on the Visions Tour performing as Elite Gymnastics.

In 2018, Boucher began a relationship with business magnate Elon Musk. They met after discovering on Twitter that they both came up with the same pun relating to Rococo and the thought experiment Roko's basilisk. On May 4, 2020, she gave birth to their son, whom they named "" (pronounced "Ex Ash A Twelve" or "Ex Ay Eye"). The name reportedly violated the naming law in California, where the child was born, and was subsequently changed to "X Æ A-Xii". According to an image of the birth certificate, the letter "X" is the child's first name, and "AE A-XII" the middle name. He is Musk's seventh child. Grimes said via Instagram that Go Won of the South Korean girl group Loona, with whom she collaborated in 2018, is her son's godmother. The couple "semi-separated" in September 2021.

In January 2022, Grimes said of her relationship with Musk: "I would probably refer to him as my boyfriend, but we're very fluid." She further revealed that their second child, a daughter named Exa Dark Sideræl Musk (nicknamed Y), was born in December 2021 via surrogate. In March 2022, following publication of the interview (which had been delayed two months before its publication), Grimes tweeted that she and Musk had broken up again but said "he's my best friend and the love of my life."

Discography

Studio albums
Geidi Primes (2010)
Halfaxa (2010)
Visions (2012)
Art Angels (2015)
Miss Anthropocene (2020)
Book 1 (TBA)

Filmography

Film

TV

Games

Tours

Headlining
 Halfaxa Tour (Canada, 2010) 
 Darkbloom Tour (North America and Europe, 2011) 
 Visions Tour (World, 2012–2014) 
 Rhinestone Cowgirls Tour (North America, 2015) 
 Ac!d Reign Tour (Asia/Europe, 2016) 
 March of the Pugs Tour (North America, 2016)

Supporting
 Lykke Li – Wounded Rhymes Tour (2011)
 Diplo and Skrillex – Full Flex Express Canadian Train Tour (2012)
 Lana Del Rey – The Endless Summer Tour (2015)
 Florence and the Machine – How Beautiful Tour (2016)
 Swedish House Mafia – Paradise Again Tour (2022)

Awards and nominations

Notes

References

External links

 
 
 

 
1988 births
Living people
4AD artists
21st-century Canadian women singers
Ableton Live users
Album-cover and concert-poster artists
Anglophone Quebec people
Arbutus Records artists
Art pop musicians
Canadian bloggers
Canadian electronic musicians
Canadian experimental musicians
Canadian feminists
Canadian keyboardists
Canadian music video directors
Canadian people of Italian descent
Canadian people of Métis descent
Canadian people of Ukrainian descent
Canadian sopranos
Canadian women artists
Canadian women bloggers
Canadian women film directors
Canadian women in electronic music
Canadian women record producers
Dream pop musicians
Electropop musicians
Experimental pop musicians
Female music video directors
Feminist artists
Feminist bloggers
Feminist musicians
Film directors from Montreal
Film directors from Vancouver
Franco-Columbian people
Indie pop musicians
Juno Award for Electronic Album of the Year winners
Juno Award for Video of the Year winners
McGill University alumni
Musicians from Montreal
Musicians from Vancouver
Musk family
People with speech impediment
Quebecers of French descent
Roc Nation artists
Synth-pop singers
Women keyboardists